Volcano bowls are ceramic drinkware originally associated with mid-20th century American tiki bars and tropical-themed restaurants. Drinks served in volcano bowls are typically rum-based, mixed with tropical fruit juices and other liquors such as brandy, vodka, and triple sec, and garnished with fruit. The Flaming Volcano cocktail is especially associated with this drinkware.

Background
Volcano bowls typically have a large capacity of 32 oz. or more, and are used to serve a communal beverage to a group of two or more friends who share the drink, often sipping simultaneously from the bowl through long, colorful  straws.  Volcano bowls are designed with a rising central hub feature formed and painted to resemble a crude volcano cone, giving the vessel a topological similarity to a Bundt pan. The central cone, in turn, is topped by a pit or "crater" which is intended to be filled with overproof rum or other flammable high-alcohol liquor. This "crater" liquor is ignited just before service, creating a festive, mildly volcanic ambience with its central blue flame. Meanwhile, the drink surrounds the "volcano cone" in a ring-shaped moat, like a pool of lava or an ocean surrounding a volcanic island.

The exterior surfaces of volcano bowls are usually decorated with painted or glazed-on tropical-themed images, such as hula dancers, palm trees, and island landscapes.

They are not to be confused with the Fat Lava style in 20th-century West German Art Pottery.

References   

Drinkware
Tiki culture